James Bond (Tag line: Nenu Kadhu Naa Pellam) is a 2015 Telugu language action comedy film written and directed by Sai Kishore Macha and produced by Anil Sunkara under the banner A.K.Entertainments. It features Allari Naresh and Sakshi Chaudhary in the lead roles while Ashish Vidyarthi, Raghu Babu and Krishna Bhagavan appear in supporting roles. The movie is loosely based on the Korean movie My Wife Is a Gangster.

Plot
Nani (Allari Naresh) is a simple, down-to-earth software employee. He and his family hate getting into problems and lead a very simple life. A twist in the tale arises when he marries a lady don Bullet (Sakshi Chaudhary) without knowing about her past and criminal activities. Halfway through his marriage, Nani discovers his wife's original background and decides to leave her and run away from the city. The rest of the story is as to how Nani manages to deal with these tricky situations and solves all his problems. Solving all the situations, at last Bullets gets pregnant and Nani is captured by the opponents, when Nani knows bullet is pregnant Nani fights the goons. After having a baby girl, the position of bullet goes with Nani. (Featuring a character as a sequel).

Cast

 Allari Naresh as Nani Edara/Lakshmi Prasad
 Sakshi Chaudhary as Bullet/Pooja Ponneganti/Edara
 Ashish Vidyarthi as Don
 Chandramohan as Nani's father
 Prabha as Pooja's mother
 Krishna Bhagavan as Marriage Bureau Chief
 Hema
 Posani Krishna Murali
 Jaya Prakash Reddy
 Raghu Babu
 Banerjee
 Prudhviraj
 Praveen
 Shravan
 Sapthagiri
 Prabhas Sreenu
 Fish Venkat
 Satya
 Rajitha

Soundtrack

The audio launch of the film was held on 14 May 2015. Actor Srikanth was present as a chief guest. Aditya Music bagged the audio rights of the film. The audio was well received by the audience. But, due to the success of film Bahubali, they announced the release date as 24 July 2015.

Track listing

Release
The movie was scheduled for a worldwide release on 26 June 2015. But, the release was postponed further. Later makers announced the release date as 24 July 2015.

References

External links
 

Films shot in Telangana
Indian action comedy films
2015 action comedy films
Films about organised crime in India
2010s Telugu-language films
Indian remakes of South Korean films
2015 comedy films
Films scored by Sai Karthik